Male Dole pri Stehanji Vasi is a small settlement just west of Stehanja Vas in the Municipality of Trebnje in eastern Slovenia. The area is part of the historical region of Lower Carniola. The municipality is now included in the Southeast Slovenia Statistical Region.

Name
The name of the settlement was changed from Male Dole to Male Dole pri Stehanji vasi in 1953. In the past the German name was Kleindule.

References

External links

Male Dole pri Stehanji Vasi at Geopedia

Populated places in the Municipality of Trebnje